Seaba's Filling Station, on historic Route 66 near Chandler, Oklahoma, was listed on the National Register of Historic Places in 1995.

It is a one-story irregularly-shaped brick building.

See also 
 Narcissa D-X Gas Station

References

External links

U.S. Route 66 in Oklahoma
Gas stations on the National Register of Historic Places in Oklahoma
National Register of Historic Places in Lincoln County, Oklahoma
Buildings and structures completed in 1921
1921 establishments in Oklahoma
Transportation in Lincoln County, Oklahoma